Ishbara Qaghan (Chinese 沙缽略可汗/沙钵略可汗, Pinyin: shābōlüè kěhàn, Wade-Giles: sha-po-lüeh k'o-han) or Erfu Kehan (Chinese: 爾伏可汗; Middle Chinese: ńźie-b'i̪uk < Ñebuk/Ñevuk or ńźie-b'uât < Ñebar/Ñevar; Sogdian: nw’’r γ’γ’n); personal name: Chinese: 阿史那攝圖/阿史那摄图, pinyin Āshǐnà Shètú/Niètú; Wade-Giles A-shih-na she-t'u/nie-t'u) (before 540 – 587) was the first son of Issik Qaghan, grandson of Bumin Qaghan, and the sixth khagan of the Turkic Khaganate (581–587). His name is non-Turkic.

As prince 
He was appointed by Taspar khagan as lesser khagan in east.

Reign 
He was appointed to the throne after resignation of Amrak, by the high council as the legal resolution to the crisis created by his uncle Taspar Qaghan who had bequeathed the title of khagan to his nephew Talopien (son of Muqan Qaghan). This act violated the traditional system of inheritance from oldest brother to youngest brother and oldest son to youngest.  Immediately after his appointment, the legal basis of his power was contested by the erstwhile heir Talopien, Jotan, and Tardu. This highly unstable situation quickly became a smoldering civil war, which the Sui Chinese took advantage of in every way possible to weaken the Göktürks.

Khagan married Princess Qianjin of Northern Zhou and accepted refugees from the Chen Dynasty, two moves that were undertaken to legitimize his authority.  One of the envoys in his wife's escort was the spy/ambassador Zhangsun Sheng. He managed to become a friend of Ishbara, and spent many years with the Turks. His knowledge about the customs and institutions of the Gokturks was of great importance for the Sui Empire.

In order to end the civil war Ishbara finally acknowledged the Sui Dynasty as his overlord. In the end Ishbara succeeded in saving the khaganate, albeit at the price of losing his sovereignty. In 587, both Ishbara Qaghan and Apa Qaghan died.

Family 
He was married to his uncle's widows Princess Qianjin of Northern Zhou. Issue:

 Tulan Qaghan
 Yami Qaghan
 Kuhezhen Tegin (庫合真特勒) - Ambassador to China in 585.
 Rudan Tegin (褥但特勒) - Ambassador to China in 593.

Notes

Sources 
Christoph Baumer, History of Central Asia, v2, p174-206 (full history of the Turkic Khaganate)

References

Notations

 The Turks / editors, Hasan Celal Güzel, C. Cem Oğuz, Osman Karatay. Other author Güzel, Hasan Celâl. Oğuz, Cem. Karatay, Osman, 1971- Ocak, Murat. Imprint Ankara : Yeni Türkiye, 2002.  (set)

Göktürk khagans
587 deaths
Year of birth unknown
Place of birth unknown
Date of death unknown
Ashina house of the Turkic Empire
6th-century Turkic people